Smin Peak is the partly ice-free peak rising to 866 m in the southeast foothills of Louis-Philippe Plateau on Trinity Peninsula in Graham Land, Antarctica.  It is surmounting Cugnot Ice Piedmont to the east and south.

The peak is named after the settlement of Smin in Northeastern Bulgaria.

Location
German-British mapping in 1996.

Maps
 Trinity Peninsula. Scale 1:250000 topographic map No. 5697. Institut für Angewandte Geodäsie and British Antarctic Survey, 1996.
 Antarctic Digital Database (ADD). Scale 1:250000 topographic map of Antarctica. Scientific Committee on Antarctic Research (SCAR). Since 1993, regularly updated.

Notes

References
 Smin Peak. SCAR Composite Antarctic Gazetteer
 Bulgarian Antarctic Gazetteer. Antarctic Place-names Commission. (details in Bulgarian, basic data in English)

External links
 Smin Peak. Copernix satellite image

Mountains of Trinity Peninsula
Bulgaria and the Antarctic